The Royal Bengal Tigers, formerly the Kolkata Tigers until the 2008 Edelweiss 20s Challenge, was one of the nine teams that played in the West Bengal Cup. The  team was based in Kolkata, India and was captained by New Zealander Brendon McCullum. The coach was former South African batsman Daryll Cullinan.

Performance

References 

Indian Cricket League teams
Cricket clubs established in 2007
Sport in Kolkata
Former senior cricket clubs of India
2007 establishments in West Bengal